Tom Orosz (born September 26, 1959) is a former punter with a 4-year career in the National Football League from 1981 to 1984. He was an All-American at Ohio State.

1959 births
Living people
American football punters
Ohio State Buckeyes football players
Miami Dolphins players
San Francisco 49ers players
Sportspeople from Greater Cleveland
People from Painesville, Ohio
Players of American football from Ohio
American people of Hungarian descent